The T-80 is a main battle tank (MBT) that was designed and manufactured in the former Soviet Union and manufactured in Russia. The T-80 is based on the T-64, while incorporating features from the later T-72. The chief designer of the T-80 was Soviet engineer Nikolay Popov. When it entered service in 1976, it was the second MBT in the world to be equipped with a gas turbine engine, after the Swedish Stridsvagn 103, and the first production tank to use it as a main propulsion engine (the first tank to use a gas turbine as a main engine was the prototype British Conqueror FV200 Turbine Test Vehicle). The T-80U was last produced in 2001 in a factory in Omsk, Russia.

The Ukrainian T-80UD diesel engine variant continued to be produced in Ukraine. The T-80 and its variants are in service in Belarus, Cyprus, Egypt, Kazakhstan, Pakistan, Russia, South Korea, Ukraine and Uzbekistan. Ukraine further developed the T-80UD as the T-84.

History

Development 
The project to build the first Soviet turbine powered tank began in 1949. Its designer was A. Ch. Starostienko, who worked at the Leningrad Kirov Plant (LKZ). The tank was never built because available turbine engines were of very poor quality. In 1955, two prototype 1,000 hp (746 kW) turbine engines were built at the same plant under the guidance of G. A. Ogloblin. Two years later a team led by Josef Kotin constructed two prototypes of the Object 278 tank. Both were hybrids of the IS-7 and the T-10 heavy tanks, powered by the GTD-1 turbine engine, weighing 53.5 tonnes and armed with an M65 130 mm tank gun. The two tanks were considered experimental vehicles and work on them eventually ceased. In 1963, the Morozov Design Bureau designed the T-64 and T-64T tanks. They used GTD-3TL turbine engines which generated 700 hp (522 kW). The tank was tested until 1965. At the same time, at Uralvagonzavod, a design team under the guidance of L. N. Kartsev created the Object 167T tank. In 1964, in its report to First Secretary Nikita Khrushchev, the team reported that the design was not worth pursuing partly due to its high fuel use.

In 1960, Khrushchev ended all heavy tank programs. LKZ, concerned with the poor reliability of the 5TD diesel engine of the T-64, was freed to focus on gas turbine tank engine development. In 1967, the S. P. Izotov bureau at the Klimov Research-Production Association was assigned to this project. Rather than re-purpose an existing helicopter engine, Izotov built the GTD-1000T from scratch.

In 1966, the LKZ built the experimental Object 288 “rocket tank,” powered by two aerial GTD-350 turbine engines with a combined power of 691 hp (515 kW). Trials indicated that twin propulsion was no better than the turbine engine which had been in development since 1968 at LKZ and Omsktransmash.

Object 219 
The tank from LKZ equipped with this turbine engine was designed by Nikolay Popov. It was constructed in 1969 and designated Object 219 SP1. It was essentially the T-64T powered by a GTD-1000T multi-fuel gas turbine engine producing up to 1,000 hp (746 kW). During the trials it became clear that the increased weight and dynamic characteristics required a complete redesign of the vehicle's suspension. The second prototype, designated Object 219 SP2, received bigger drive sprockets and return rollers. The number of road wheels was increased from five to six. The construction of the turret was altered to use the same compartment, 125 mm 2A46 tank gun, autoloader and placement of ammunition as the T-64A. Some other equipment was borrowed from the T-64A. The LKZ plant built a series of prototypes based on Object 219 SP2.

In November 1974, Minister of Defence Andrei Grechko, denied approval to put the Object 219 into production due to the tank's high fuel use and lack of advantages in armament and armour over other tanks then in production. Grechko died in April 1976, and Dmitry Ustinov, an enthusiastic supporter of the Object 219, was appointed in his place. The Object 219-2 was accepted for production as the T-80 in August 1976.

Production history

The Object 219R, incorporating Combination K composite armour, was accepted for Soviet service in 1978 as the T-80B. Production of the original T-80 ended that same year. The T-80B entered production at Omsktransmash in 1979. Omsk developed a command version called the T-80BK. The T-80B was deployed with the Group of Soviet Forces in Germany in 1981.

Initially, the T-80 was confused with the Soviet T-72 by some Western analysts. They are the products of different design bureaus; the T-80 is from the SKB-2 design bureau of the Kirov Factory (LKZ) in Leningrad while the T-72 is from the Uralvagonzavod factory in Nizhny Tagil. They are similar in superficial appearance, but the T-80 is based on the earlier T-64, while incorporating features from the T-72, which was a complementary design. The T-64 in turn was an earlier high-technology main battle tank, designed by the Morozov Design Bureau (KMDB) in Kharkiv to replace the T-54, T-55 and T-62 MBTs, used before in the Soviet Union.

From a distance, the T-64, T-72 and T-80 look alike. Despite the similarities, the T-80 is 90 cm longer than the T-64, and the T-80 and T-72 are mechanically very different. The T-72 is mechanically simpler, easier to manufacture, and easier to service in the field. As such, the T-72 was intended to be a tank mass-produced to equip the bulk of the Soviet motor rifle units, and for sale to export partners and Eastern-bloc satellite states.

The T-80 design improved on several aspects of the earlier T-64 design, introducing a gas turbine engine in the original model, and incorporating suspension components of the T-72. This gave the tank a high power-to-weight ratio and made it easily the most mobile tank in service, albeit with acute range problems, as the turbine used fuel rapidly, even at engine idle. (Morozov's subsequent parallel development of the T-80UD replaced the gas turbine with a commercial turbo-diesel, to decrease fuel use and maintenance needs.) In comparison to its anticipated opponent, the American M1 Abrams has a larger, 1,500 hp (1,120 kW), gas turbine, but weighs 61 tons compared to the T-80s 42.6 tons, so it has a worse hp/t ratio of 24.5 compared to 27.1 and is less manoeuvrable than the T-80 (with GT). The T-80 can fire the same 9K112 Kobra (AT-8 Songster) anti-tank guided missile through the main gun as the T-64.

The T-80U main battle tank (1985, "U" for uluchsheniye, meaning "improvement") was designed by SKB-2 in Leningrad (hull) and the Morozov Bureau (turret and armament). It is a further development of the T-80A and is powered by the 1,250 hp (919 kW) GTD-1250 gas turbine. It is a step ahead of the GTD-1000T and GTD-1000TF engines that were installed on the previous tanks of the T-80 line. This gas turbine can use jet fuels, diesel, and low-octane gasoline, and has good dynamic stability, service life, and reliability. The GTD-1250 has a built-in automatic system of dust deposit removal. It retains the T-80s high fuel use, which the Russian army found unacceptable during the Chechen conflicts. It is equipped with the 2A46 fire control system and a new turret. The T-80U is protected by a second generation of explosive reactive armour called Kontakt-5, which can reduce the penetration of armour-piercing fin-stabilized discarding sabot (APFSDS) rounds, such as the M829A1 "Silver Bullet", by 38%, and of high-explosive anti-tank (HEAT) rounds. Kontakt-5 had been developed as a response to the threat of modern APFSDS spurred by testing that found that the Israeli 105mm M111 APFSDS ammunition could defeat the glacis armour of the latest models of the T-72 and T-80.

The Kontakt-5 is integrated into the design of the turret, hull, and Brod-M deep wading equipment. Like all of the previous T-80 models, the T-80U has full length rubber side skirts protecting the sides with those above the first three road wheels being armoured and are provided with lifting handles. It can fire the 9M119 Refleks (AT-11 Sniper) guided missile and the long-rod penetrator (HVAPFSDS) 3BM46. The remotely controlled commander's machine gun was replaced by a more flexible pintle-mounted one. A special camouflage paint distorts the tank's appearance in the visible and IR wavebands. The T-80U's 1A46 fire control system includes a laser range finder, a ballistics computer, and a more advanced 1G46 gunner's main sights, which greatly increases the T-80Us firepower over previous models. These new systems, together with the 125 mm D-81TM "Rapira-3" smooth bore gun, ensure that the T-80U can hit targets at a range of up to 5 kilometers (ATGMs and HV/APFSDS). An experienced crew at the international exhibition was able to successfully strike 52 targets without a miss at a distance of 5 km using guided rockets.

The T-80U(M) of the 1990s introduced the TO1-PO2 Agava gunner's thermal imaging sight and 9M119M Refleks-M guided missile, and later an improved 2A46M-4 version of the 125 mm gun and 1G46M gunner's sight was used.

Russian tank production faltered in the years before and after the breakup of the Soviet Union. At the two remaining Russian tank plants, state orders all but ceased. Omsk, then the only Russian producer of the T-80, received orders for just five T-80Us in 1992. Around the same time, the Russian Ministry of Defense decided it would commit to eventually producing one tank type only. Though both Nizhni-Tagil's T-90 and Omsk's T-80U had their merits, the T-80 was notorious for its high fuel use and poor engine reliability. Also, Russian T-80BVs suffered appalling losses in their first combat use during the First Chechen War. T-90s, which were not deployed to Chechnya, were spared media criticism despite the similarly poor performance of the T-72 (the T-90's not-so-different ancestor) in the same conflict. In January 1996, Colonel General Aleksandr Galkin, chief of Main Armour Directorate of the Russian Ministry of Defense, said the Russian Armed Forces would phase out T-80 production in favor of the T-90 (Galkin reversed his position later that year, claiming the T-80U was a superior tank). Production of the T-80 at Omsk persisted until 2001, mainly for the export market.

Ukrainian T-80UD
In parallel with the T-80U and Russia in general, the Morozov Bureau in Ukraine developed a diesel-powered version, the T-80UD. It is powered by the 1,000 hp 6TD-6-cylinder opposed-piston multi-fuel two-stroke turbo-piston diesel engine, ensuring high fuel efficiency and a long cruising range. The engine support systems make it possible to operate the tank at ambient temperatures of up to 55 °C and ford water obstacles 1.8 m in depth. The T-80UD shares most of the T-80U's improvements, but can be distinguished from it by a different engine deck and distinctive smoke-mortar array and turret stowage boxes. It retains the remotely-controlled commander's machine gun. About 500 T-80UD tanks were built in the Malyshev plant between 1987 and 1991. About 300 were still at the Ukrainian factory when the Soviet Union broke up, so the T-80UD tank was welcomed into Ukrainian military service, and therefore is more common in Ukrainian service than Russian. Unlike Russia, Ukraine has had much better success selling T-80s to foreign customers. Cyprus bought a number of T-80Us and T-80UKs from Russia for its army. Pakistan, countering India's adoption of the Russian T-90, bought Ukrainian T-80UDs for the Pakistan Armoured Corps.

The Ukrainian T-84 main battle tank is based on the T-80UD. Ukraine was only able to afford a negligible number of T-84s for its own use, but did market the tank for export. The T-84 Oplot (first delivered in 2001) introduced turret-bustle ammunition storage; and to offer more sales to international market, the T-84-120 Yatagan has been offered for export featuring a very large turret bustle and NATO-compatible 120 mm gun.

Service history

Soviet Union

In 1985, there were 1,900 T-80 MBTs overall. According to data published in Russia, 2,256 T-80s (up to the T-80BV model, as T-80Us were never deployed in Europe) were stationed with the Group of Soviet Forces in Germany (GSFG) in East Germany between 1986 and 1987. In 1991, when the Soviet Union was breaking up, the Soviet Army operated 4,839 T-80 MBTs of several different models.

In August 1991, communists and allied military commanders tried to overthrow Mikhail Gorbachev and regain control over the unstable Soviet Union. T-80UD tanks of the 4th Guards Kantemirovskaya Tank Division drove onto the streets of Moscow but the Soviet coup attempt failed when the tank crews refused to attack the audience or the parliament.

Russia
Before the 2022 Russian invasion of Ukraine, the T-80 was not used in the way in which it was intended (large-scale conventional war in Europe). Until 2022, it was deployed during the political and economic changes in Russia in the 1990s.

Most T-80 MBTs are possessed by Russia, though many were inherited by Ukraine, Belarus, and Kazakhstan.

In 1995, the number of T-80 tanks increased to around 5,000 but was reduced in 1998 to 3,500.

The Russian Army had 3,044 T-80s and variants in active service and 1,456 in reserve . There are at least 460 T-80UD in service with 2nd Guards Tamanskaya Motor Rifle Division and 4th Guards Kantemirowsk Motor Rifle Division. A T-80BV is on display in Kubinka Tank Museum and a T-80U is on display at an open-air museum in Saratov. The T-80Us have recently been seen at arms expos in Russia such as VTTV.

During the 1993 Russian constitutional crisis, Boris Yeltsin ordered the use of tanks against the Supreme Soviet and the Congress of People's Deputies opposing him. On 4 October 1993, six T-80UD from the 13th Guards Tank Regiment, 4th Guards Kantemirovskaya Tank Division took positions on a bridge opposite the Russian parliament building, and fired on it.

First Chechen War
T-80B and T-80BV were never used in Afghanistan in the 1980s to keep the tank's characteristics a secret, but they were first used during the First Chechen War. This first real combat experience for T-80 was unsuccessful, as the tanks were used to capture cities, a task for which they were not very well suited due to the low depression and elevation of the 2A46-M1 gun on all Russian MBTs.

The biggest tank losses were suffered during the ill-fated assault in the Battle of Grozny, which began in December 1994. During three months of combat, Russia lost 18 of the 84 T-80 tanks used between the 133rd Tank Battalion and 3rd Tank Battalion. The forces selected to capture Grozny were not prepared for such an operation, while the city was defended by, among others, former Soviet soldiers. Some T-80 tanks used in the assault lacked explosive reactive armor inserts.

Several tank-to-tank battles were recorded. During the fighting in late December 1994 – early January 1995, Russian T-80 tanks destroyed at least six rebel tanks. On the other side, one T-80 was disabled by the hit of one 125 mm shell, Another T-80 received three or four hits of tank shells but remained in service. In August 1996, a T-80 destroyed one rebel tank.

The inexperienced crews had little knowledge of the layout of the city, while the tanks were attacked by rocket-propelled grenade teams hidden in cellars and on top of high buildings. The anti-tank fire was directed at the least armoured parts of the vehicles.

In the buildup of forces before the assault on Grozny, T-80s had been transferred from depots to units with little experience with the tank. When no auxiliary power unit is equipped, the T-80's gas turbine engines use almost as much fuel idling as when they are running. Most tank crews inadvertently exhausted their fuel this way on the day of the assault.

After the First Chechen War
The T-80 performed so poorly in the First Chechen War that General-Lieutenant Aleksandr Galkin, the head of the Armour Directorate, convinced the Minister of Defence after the conflict to never again procure tanks with gas turbine engines (Galkin reversed his position in 1996, claiming that the T-80U was superior to the T-90). After that, T-80 MBTs were never again used to capture cities, and, instead, they supported infantry squads from a safe distance. Defenders of the T-80 explain that the T-72 performed just as badly in urban fighting in Grozny as the T-80 and that there were two mitigating factors: after the breakup of the Soviet Union: poor funding meant no training for new Russian tank crews, and the tank force entering the city had no infantry support.

Russia did not deploy T-80 tanks in later conflicts such as the 1999 Second Chechen War, the 2008 Russo-Georgian War, or the 2014 Russo-Ukrainian War.

Russian invasion of Ukraine

During the 2022 Russian invasion of Ukraine, Russian forces used T-80 tanks alongside T-72s and T-90s. Some were outfitted with improvised steel grilles on top of turrets, pejoratively called "cope cages" as a meme in online communities. These are erroneously thought to have been fit to counter top-attack munitions such as the FGM-148 Javelin and loitering munitions; the cage add-on was in fact equipped after concerns regarding urban fighting and experiences acquired during the Chechen conflict, in which several Russian tanks were lost due to shoulder-mounted anti-tank weapon fire from buildings.

Exports

United Kingdom
In 1992, the United Kingdom bought a number of T-80U MBTs for defence research and development. They were not bought officially but through a specially created trading company, which was supposed to deliver them to Morocco. The price of $5 million offered for each tank ensured a lack of suspicion on the part of the Russians. Britain evaluated the tanks on its proving grounds and transferred one to the US where the Americans evaluated it on the Aberdeen Proving Ground. In January 1994, British Minister of State for Defence Procurement Jonathan Aitken confirmed in parliamentary debates that a Russian T-80U tank was imported for "defence research and development purposes".

South Korea

South Korea was given 33 T-80U and 2 T-80UK tanks to pay Russian debts incurred during the days of the Soviet Union. The tanks came in three batches; the first consisted of six T-80Us in 1996, followed by 27 T-80Us in 1997, and finally two T-80UKs in 2005.

When South Korea first acquired the T-80 in the late 1990s, it was the most advanced tank on the Korean Peninsula, superior to the domestic K1 88-Tank in having a larger 125 mm gun to the K1's 105 mm. However, as time went on, the K1 was upgraded into the K1A1 and the more advanced K2 Black Panther entered service, while the T-80 changed little since its delivery due to the foreign nature of the design and lack of will to add domestic upgrades. While the South Korean tanks use domestically manufactured ammunition, T-80 shells and most parts must be imported, increasing maintenance costs as the cost of ordering replacement parts kept rising steadily. Although the turbine engine is lighter with better acceleration, it uses more fuel and is less reliable. The interior has been criticized as cramped and gunnery was underperforming via less advanced sights and slower reload speed.

Pakistan
Ukrainian exports of the T-80UD have been moderately successful. In 1993 and 1995, Ukraine demonstrated the tank to Pakistan, which was looking for a new main battle tank. The tank was tested in Pakistan and in August 1996 Pakistan decided to buy 320 T-80UD tanks from Ukraine for $650 million in two variants: a standard Object 478B and export Object 478BE. The tanks were all supposed to be delivered in 1997. After the first batch of 15 vehicles had been shipped in February 1997, Russia protested that it held the rights to the tank and that Ukraine couldn't export it. Nearly 70% of T-80UD components were produced outside of Ukraine (mainly in Russia). Under the guise of keeping good relations with India, one of its most important military customers, Russia withheld 2A46-2 125 mm smoothbore guns, cast turrets and other technology, which forced Ukraine to make its tank industry independent. It developed domestic components, including a welded turret, which was in use on the new Ukrainian T-84. Ukraine was able to ship 20 more T-80UD tanks to Pakistan between February and May 1997. These 35 tanks were from Ukrainian Army stocks of 52 T-80UDs; they were built in the Malyshev plant several years before but were not delivered to their original destination. Their abilities were below the standard agreed by both Ukraine and Pakistan. The contract was completed by shipping another 285 Ukrainian T-80UD MBTs between 1997 and early 2002. These had the welded turret and other manufacturing features of the T-84.

Cyprus
Cyprus is the first foreign country to officially obtain T-80 tanks. Russia sold 27 T-80U and 14 T-80UK for $174 million to Cyprus in 1996. The tanks arrived in two batches. The first shipment consisted of 27 T-80U MBTs arriving in 1996, while the second batch of 14 T-80UK MBTs arrived in 1997. This significantly improved the abilities of Cypriot army armoured forces; their most potent tank until then was the AMX-30B2. New tanks gave the Cypriot National Guard the edge in a possible confrontation with the Turkish Army in Northern Cyprus. In October 2009 Cyprus ordered another batch of 41 used T-80Us and T-80UKs from Russia for €115 million. Deliveries were completed in the first half of 2011.

United States
The US government obtained one T-80U from the United Kingdom. It was evaluated at Eglin Air Force Base. In 2003, Ukraine transferred four T-80UD MBTs to the US.

Failed export attempts
Apart from Cyprus and the People's Republic of China, Russia has tried to export T-80 MBTs to Turkey and Greece, who were looking for new tanks. These two attempts have failed. Sweden regarded the T-80 an alternative for its mechanized brigades in the early 1990s should the Leclerc be adopted for her armoured brigades, but since the new upgraded Leopard 2 (Strv 122) was chosen, Leopard 2A4s (Strv 121) equipped the mechanized brigades as to simplify logistics.

Description
The T-80 is similar in layout to the T-64; the driver's compartment is on the centre line at the front, the two-man turret is in the centre with the gunner on the left and the commander on the right, and the engine is rear mounted. Overall, its shape is also very similar to the T-64.

Mobility 

The original T-80 design uses a 1,000 hp monobloc gas turbine engine instead of a 750-hp diesel engine of the T-64; later variants of the T-80 reverted to diesel engine usage. The gearbox is different, with five forward and one reverse gear, instead of seven forward and one reverse. Suspension reverts from pneumatic to torsion bar, with six forged steel-aluminium rubber-tyred road wheels on each side, with the tracks driven by rear sprockets.

The tracks are slightly wider and longer than on the T-64 giving lower ground pressure.

Armament 
The turret houses the same 125 mm 2A46 smoothbore gun as the T-72, which can fire regular ordnance and anti-tank guided missiles.

The main gun is fed by the Korzina automatic loader. This holds up to 28 rounds of two-part ammunition in a carousel located under the turret floor. Further ammunition is stored in the turret. The ammunition comprises the projectile (APFSDS, HEAT, or HE-Frag), and the propellant charge, or the two-part missile. The autoloader is an effective, reliable, combat tested system that has been in use since the mid-1960s. The propellant charge is held inside a semi-combustible cartridge case made of a highly flammable material, which is consumed in the breech during firing, except for a small metal baseplate.

The autoloader takes between 7.1 and 19.5 seconds to load the main weapon (28 rounds), depending on the initial position of autoloader carousel.

Armour 
The glacis is of laminate armour and the turret is armoured steel, with cavities in the turret cheeks containing either a ceramic filling or non-explosive reactive armour elements.

The T-80's armour is composite on the turret and hull, while rubber flaps and sideskirts protect the sides and lower hull. Later T-80 models use explosive reactive armour and stronger armour, like the T-80U and T-80UM1. Other protection systems include the Shtora-1 and Arena APS, and the discontinued Drozd APS.

A disadvantage highlighted during combat in Chechnya was the vulnerability of the T-80BV to catastrophic explosion thought to be caused by the vulnerability of stored semi-combustible propellant charges and missiles when contacted by the molten metal jet from the penetration of a HEAT warhead, causing the entire ammunition load to explode. This vulnerability may be addressed in later models. When Western tank designs changed from non-combustible propellant cartridges to semi-combustible, they tended to separate ammunition stowage from the crew compartment with armoured blast doors, and provided 'blow-out' panels to redirect the force and fire of exploding ammunition away from the crew compartment.

T-80 models

This section lists the main models of the T-80, built in the Soviet Union, Russia and Ukraine, with the dates they entered service.

Command tanks with more radio equipment have K added to their designation for komandirskiy ("command"), for example, T-80BK is the command version of the T-80B. Versions with reactive armour have V added, for vzryvnoy ("explosive"), for example T-80BV. Lower cost versions with no missile ability have a figure 1 added, as T-80B1.
 T-80 (1976): Initial model, with 1,000 hp gas turbine engine, coincidence rangefinder, and no missile capability. This model does not have fittings for explosive reactive armour. The turret is from the T-64A, and thus retains the use of the old coincidence rangefinder. Characteristics of this type are the V shaped water deflector on the front glacis, coincidence rangefinder in front of the commander's cupola, and Luna searchlight mounted in the same position as a T-64. Around 250 were produced, as the tank's armour was essentially obsolete when introduced. Turret vs APFSDS – 380 mm, hull vs APFSDS – 500 mm (without reactive armour). This was, in effect, a pre-production model. It reportedly was fitted with an early version of the Shtora APS.
 T-80B (1978): This model had a new turret with improved composite armor, laser rangefinder, new fire-control system, new autoloader and missile launcher system capable of firing 9M112-1 Kobra antitank guided missile through the gun barrel. An improved, 1,100 hp, engine was added in 1980, a new gun in 1982, and fittings for reactive armour in 1985. A night sight TPNZ-49 in active mode reached 1,300 m and a passive – 850 m.
 T-80BV (1985): T-80BV ( model 1985) is a T-80B upgraded with Kontakt-1 ERA on turret and hull. Smoke discharges are re-positioned to make a room on the turret for ERA. There is a new gun 2A46M-1 with 9K112 Kobra system capable of firing improved 9M112M Kobra ATGM through gun barrel.
T-80BV also introduced a new 5 part armor array on the hull unlike the old 3 part T-80B. T-80B's were upgraded with applique armor 30mm high hardness steel plate to increase it's protection to the same level.
 Object 219A: Early T-80U (Object 219AS) variant. It has the T-80U's turret, but not the Kontakt-5 ERA. Instead, it uses the old Kontakt-1/3 system; some 219As did not have ERA at all. Often misnamed T-80A.
 T-80U (1987): Further development with a better turret, Kontakt-5 explosive reactive armour, Shtora-1 APS, improved gunnner's sight. There is the same gun 2A46M-1 as on T-80BV but with a new 9K120 Svir system which allows firing 9M119 Svir ATGM. In 1990, a new 1,250 hp engine was installed.  Overall protection with Kontakt-5 against APFSDS or HEAT is 780/1,320 mm RHAe. 9K119M with antitank guided missile 9M119M installed since 1990. 
 T-80UD Bereza (1987): Ukrainian diesel version with 1,000 hp 6TD engine and remote-controlled antiaircraft machine gun.
 T-80UK: Commander version equipped with Shtora-1 APS, thermal imaging night sight TO1-PO2T (detection range, target classification range = 6,400; 4,600 meters at night), new atmospheric parameter sensor, R-163U and R-163K radio stations, TNA-4 navigation system, HE shell remote detonation system, AB-1-P28 autonomous power plant. Adopted by the army in the 1990s.
T-80UE: Export version similar to T-80UK version, with Shtora-1 APS and other improvements, no orders received.
T-80UE-1: Not to be confused with the attempted export version T-80UE, this version is made by mating T-80UD turret with T-80BV hull (with some improvements to bring the hull to T-80U level, as Kontakt-5 ERA for example).
 T-80UM (1995):  Russian version, with new Buran thermal imaging sight in place of the Luna IR.
 Object 478BK (1995): Further Ukrainian development of T-80UD with 1,200 hp diesel and new welded turret.
 T-80UM-1 "Bars" (1997): Russian prototype with new Arena active protection system; bricks all around the turret visible on the outer side are Arena APS projectile casings, while Kontakt-5 ERA bricks lay behind them on the front part of the turret.
 T-80BVD (2002): KMDB's upgrade standard for Ukrainian T-80BVs. Changes include the 6TD diesel engine, remote-controlled commander's machine gun, and better optics. None were produced
 T-80UM-2: Russian experimental prototype with the older KAZT Drozd-1 active protection system. In 2022, the only known prototype was destroyed by Ukrainian forces some time in March. This has been visually confirmed via photos taken by Ukrainian soldiers as well as the 3rd party monitoring site, Oryx.
 Black Eagle or Object 640 (prototype, cancelled): Two Russian prototypes were shown at trade shows, with a longer chassis and extra pair of road wheels, and a very large turret with redesigned layout, separate ammunition compartment and new ERA array.
 T-80BVM (2017): Features "Relikt" ERA, Irtysh fire control, Sosna-U gunner's sight (as on T-90A), an improved 125mm gun 2A46M-5, 9K119M Refleks-M missile system, upgraded gas turbine engine and upgrades of various other systems. The tank also has a new autoloader capable of firing the depleted uranium 3BM59 APFSDS shell and the tungsten 3BM60. The Russian armed forces have received all the modernized T-80BVM tanks under the contract with the Rostec corporation, signed in 2017, Rostec said on 12 December 2019. A new contract for 50 tanks was signed in August 2020 and a new one in August 2022.  deliveries were underway.

Operators 
Under the Soviet Union, the T-80 was never exported; it was exported only after the collapse of the Soviet Union, when the T-80 was henceforth produced in Russia.

Current operators
 
 : There were 95 T-80Us in service in 2000 and 69 in 2012 and 2015.
 : 27 T-80Us and 14 T-80UKs were ordered in 1996 from Russia;. In 2010, a further 27 T-80Us and 14 T-80UKs were delivered from Russian surplus.
 : 4-5 T-80Us used for training in the military school of the city of Karaganda.
 : 320 T-80UDs (Object 478BE) were ordered in 1996 from Ukraine and delivered between 1997 and 1999.
 : 480 T-80s in active service. 3,000 T-80B/T-80BV/T-80U in storage. To be upgraded to T-80BVM standard.
 : 33 T-80Us were delivered to South Korea from 1995 to 1997, as a part of payment for the debt incurred during the Soviet era. Two T-80UKs were acquired from Russia in 2005. Unlike the other downgraded export version, South Korea received the batch built for then Soviet's domestic use. Moscow was seeking the possibility of their return in 2016.
 : 345 T-80UD's were in service in 1995, 273 in 2000, and 271 in 2005. The type was eventually retired but then  after Russia's invasion of Ukraine in 2014, plans were made to refurbish up to 100 for Ukraine's Airborne forces. By 2022, most Ukrainian airborne brigades had independent companies of T-80BV tanks attached. During the Russian invasion of 2022, photos confirm Ukraine has lost at least 39 T-80BVs captured or destroyed. However, by late January 2023 photos show Ukraine had captured at least 81 T-80BVs, 33 T-80BVMs, 43 T-80Us, 7 T-80UE-1s, and two command tanks from Russian forces.
 : 80 T-80BV inherited from USSR.
 : Bought 31 T-80Us from Russia in 2000. Bought 66 T-80BVs from Belarus.

Disputed operators
  – Some pieces of information claim that Russia has signed a contract with the People's Republic of China to sell 200 T-80U tanks in 1993. But only 50 T-80Us were purchased for unknown reasons. These T-80Us are only used for testing and evaluation purposes as reference samples for the development of their domestic tanks. However, there is no official information that can prove this situation from China.

Former operators
 : 4 T-80s were bought during the late 1980s for evaluation but were rejected due to having no relative improvement over the T-72. The indigenous upgrade of Bulgarian T-72M to T-72M2 were a result of the technical information learned from evaluating the T-80s.
 : 1,900 T-80s in service in 1985, 4,000 in 1990, and 4,839 during the breakup of the USSR. All were passed on to successor states (including Russia).

Failed bids
  – T-80U took part in the tender for Greece, but lost against the Leopard 2A6.
  – T-80UD took part in the tender for the Malaysian Army, but lost against the PT-91M Pendekar.
  – T-80U took part in the tender for Sweden, but lost against the Leopard 2A4.
  – T-80U took part in the tender for Turkey, but lost against the Leopard 2A4.

See also

 List of main battle tanks by country
 List of main battle tanks by generation

Notes
Notes

Citations

References

External links

 Kharkiv Morozov: T-80UD
 Main Battle Tank T-80U
 T-80U Main Battle Tank at the Armor Site
 Video T-80 main battle tank
 Object 478 (T-80UD Prototype) Walkaround
 T-80BV Walkaround
 T-80U Armour.ws
 Virtual tour inside the T-80BV 

Cold War tanks of the Soviet Union
Main battle tanks of the Cold War
Post–Cold War main battle tanks
Main battle tanks of the Soviet Union
Main battle tanks of Russia
Main battle tanks of Ukraine
Gas turbine vehicles
Tanks with autoloaders
Kirov Plant products
Military vehicles introduced in the 1970s